The 1998 Wandsworth Council election took place on 7 May 1998 to elect members of Wandsworth London Borough Council in London, England. The whole council was up for election and the Conservative party stayed in overall control of the council.

At the same as the election Wandsworth saw 74.3% vote in favour of the 1998 Greater London Authority referendum and 25.7% against, on a 38.7% turnout.

Campaign

In the run up to the election a private Conservative poll was leaked which showed them 17% behind Labour and likely to only win in 4 wards as compared to 18 for Labour. However Labour and the Liberal Democrats accused the Conservatives of leaking the poll in order to lower expectations. The Conservatives would have lost control of the council on a 7% swing from the 1994 election, or if the 1997 general election results in the area were repeated. However Wandsworth had low council tax levels,  the lowest in the country, and the Conservatives had recently cut the tax by 24%. This meant commentators expected the Conservatives to stay in control of what was described as their showpiece council.

For the election 9 of the 22 wards that made up the council were seen as being marginal.

Election result
The results saw the Conservatives increase their control of the council gaining an extra 5 seats. This meant that with 50 seats the Conservatives had the most seats they had yet had on the council. Labour lost seats in St John and Roehampton wards, which was put down to the closure of the local Queen Mary's Hospital. Voter turnout at 40% was 10% down on the previous 1994 election.

Ward results

References

1998 London Borough council elections
1998